18/4 can refer to:
 April 18, in MM/DD notation
 American wire gauge 18, 4 conductor wire, commonly used for thermostats in the United States